2011 Copa FGF also known as  Copa Dra Laci Ughini 2011, was the 8th edition of Copa FGF. 22 teams participated in the tournament.

The winner qualified for 2011 Recopa Sul-Brasileira and 2012 Campeonato Brasileiro Série D. Moreover, if the 2012 Campeonato Gaúcho winner and runner-up were Grêmio and Internacional (GRE–NAL), the runner-up of the cup would have been allocated one of the three spots of the state to 2013 Copa do Brasil, otherwise the champion, runner-up and the third place of the league would have been qualified for the cup. If a berth for 2013 Copa do Brasil was vacant because one of the top three of 2012 Campeonato Gaúcho qualified for 2013 Copa Libertadores, the runner-up would have also qualified.

Format
The clubs were divided into three groups according to their locations (Metropolitan, Border and Mountain), and played a double round-robin in each group. The best five teams in each group and the best 6th-placed team of group 1 advanced to the knockout stage. The application to the competition was opened on 20 June and 22 teams applied.

Participating teams

Campeonato Gaúcho

Segunda Divisão
 14 de Julho (Santana do Livramento)
 Aimoré (São Leopoldo)
 Brasil de Pelotas (Pelotas)
 Cerâmica (Gravataí)
 Esportivo (Bento Gonçalves)
 Guarany de Bagé (Bagé)
 Guarany de Camaquã (Camaquã)
 Passo Fundo (Passo Fundo)
 Santo Ângelo (Santo Ângelo)
 São Paulo (RS) (Rio Grande)
 Riopardense (Rio Pardo)

Other participating teams
 Pedrabranca (Alvorada)
 Nova Prata

Group stage

Group 1 – Taça Região Metropolitana

Group 2 – Taça Região Serrana

Group 3 – Taça Região Fronteira

Knockout stages

Bracket

References

External links
Federação Gaúcha de Futebol 

Copa FGF
Copa Fgf, 2011
Copa FGF